Shkodër or Shkodra is a city and municipality in the northwest of Albania.

Shkodër or Shkodra may also refer to:

 Shkodër County, first-level administrative division of Albania
 Shkodër District, former administrative division of Albania
 Lake of Shkodër, the largest lake in Southern Europe

See also 
Scutari Vilayet